Sandrine Gruda (born 25 June 1987) is a French professional basketball player for PF Schio. Her primary position is center.

Before the WNBA
She is the daughter of Ulysse Gruda, who played for the French men's national basketball team, and grew up on Martinique. Before joining the WNBA, Gruda played professionally for the French club Union Sportive Valenciennes Olympic. She began playing on senior level in 2002, and professionally in 2005. She was voted the best European young women's player of the year 2006.

WNBA career

Gruda was drafted 13th overall in the 2007 WNBA Draft by the Connecticut Sun. She did not join the Sun until the 2008 season. She was highly touted by head coach Mike Thibault before joining the team. During her rookie season, she provided solid bench play and with her height and length, was a consistent rebounder and shot-blocker.

In 2014, she returned to the WNBA after a three-year absence, joining the Los Angeles Sparks as a reserve on the roster. Gruda sat out the 2015 season to prepare for the 2016 Summer Olympics with the France women's national basketball team in the qualifying tournament. In 2016, Gruda re-signed with the Sparks after the Olympic break. Later on in the season, Gruda would win her first WNBA championship with the Sparks after they defeated the Minnesota Lynx 3–2 in the Finals. Following the championship victory, after not being re-signed during free agency, Gruda returned to the Sparks midway through the 2017 season. The Sparks would go on to advance to the Finals for the second season in a row, after defeating the Phoenix Mercury in a 3-game sweep, setting up a rematch with the Lynx. However, the Sparks would lose to the Lynx in five games.

Overseas career
She played for the Russian club UMMC Ekaterinburg from 2007 to 2016. On 6 July 2016, Fenerbahçe Istanbul announced her transfer to the club.

National team
Gruda is the starting center for the France women's national basketball team, and led her team to the EuroBasket 2009 title. She was the best scorer and rebounder of the French side, and was voted to the all-tournament team. She also took part in the World Championship 2006 and the EuroBasket 2007, reaching the quarter-finals both times.

References

External links
Sandrine Gruda Official Site sandrinegruda.com

1987 births
Living people
Basketball players at the 2012 Summer Olympics
Basketball players at the 2016 Summer Olympics
Basketball players at the 2020 Summer Olympics
Centers (basketball)
Connecticut Sun draft picks
Connecticut Sun players
Fenerbahçe women's basketball players
French expatriate basketball people in Italy
French expatriate basketball people in Russia
French expatriate basketball people in Turkey
French expatriate basketball people in the United States
French people of Martiniquais descent
French women's basketball players
Knights of the Ordre national du Mérite
Los Angeles Sparks players
Medalists at the 2012 Summer Olympics
Medalists at the 2020 Summer Olympics
Olympic basketball players of France
Olympic medalists in basketball
Olympic silver medalists for France
Olympic bronze medalists for France
Sportspeople from Cannes
France women's national basketball team players